The 2013 Telus Cup was Canada's 35th annual national midget 'AAA' hockey championship, held April 22 – 28, 2013 at the Essar Centre in Sault Ste. Marie, Ontario.  The Red Deer Chiefs defeated the Ottawa Junior 67's in the gold medal game to win their second straight national title.  The Rousseau Royal de Laval-Montréal won the bronze medal.  This was Sault Ste. Marie's second time hosting the national championship – the 2003 Air Canada Cup was played at the old Sault Memorial Gardens.

Teams

Round robin

Standings

Schedule

Monday, April 22
Saskatoon 4 - Ottawa 2
Red Deer 5 - Laval-Montréal 1
Sault Ste Marie 6 - Valley 2

Tuesday, April 23
Laval-Montréal 7 - Saskatoon 0
Ottawa 4 - Valley 2
Sault Ste. Marie 4 - Red Deer 3

Wednesday, April 24
Laval-Montréal 7 - Valley 1
Red Deer 5 - Saskatoon 5
Ottawa 6 - Sault Ste. Marie 1

Thursday, April 25
Red Deer 8 - Valley 1
Laval-Montréal 4 - Ottawa 3
Sault Ste. Marie 1 - Saskatoon 1

Friday, April 26
Red Deer 2 - Ottawa 2
Saskatoon 9 - Valley 1
Laval-Montréal 9 - Sault Ste. Marie 2

Playoffs

Individual awards
Most Valuable Player: Matthew Hudson (Ottawa)
Top Scorer: Massimo Carozza (Laval-Montréal)
Top Forward: Kolten Olynek (Saskatoon)
Top Defenceman: Gabe Bast (Red Deer)
Top Goaltender: Simon Hofley (Ottawa)
Most Sportsmanlike Player: Massimo Carozza (Laval-Montréal)
Esso Scholarship: Joshua Bergen (Saskatoon)

Road to the Telus Cup

Atlantic Region
Tournament held April 4 – 7, 2013 at the Red Ball Internet Centre in Moncton, New Brunswick

Championship Game
Valley 4 - Cornwall 3
Valley Wildcats advance to Telus Cup

Quebec
Ligue de Hockey Midget AAA du Quebec championship series played March 28 – April 9, 2013

Rousseau Royal de Laval-Montréal advance to Telus Cup

Central Region
Tournament held March 30 – April 5, 2013 at the Brockville Memorial Centre in Brockville, Ontario

Semi-finals
Whitby 4 - Sault Ste. Marie 3 OT
Ottawa 2 - Vaughan 1

Bronze Medal Game
Vaughan 7 - Sault Ste. Marie 3

Gold Medal Game
Ottawa 6 - Whitby 5 OT
Ottawa Jr. 67's advance to Telus Cup

West Region
Tournament held April 4 – 7, 2013 at the Kenora Recreation Centre in Kenora, Ontario

Championship Game
Saskatoon 3 - Thunder Bay 0

Saskatoon Contacts advance to Telus Cup

Pacific Region
Best-of-3 playoff series played April 5 – 7, 2013 at the Burnaby Winter Club in Burnaby, British Columbia.

Red Deer Chiefs advance to Telus Cup

See also
Telus Cup

References

MidgetAAACanada.com
2013 Coupe TELUS Cup Gold Medal Champions: Red Deer Chiefs (Pacific)

External links
2013 Telus Cup Home Page
Midget AAA Canada Website
Midget AAA Telus Cup Regional Championship Website
Hockey Canada-Telus Cup Guide and Record Book

Telus Cup
Telus Cup
Sport in Sault Ste. Marie, Ontario
April 2013 sports events in Canada
Ice hockey competitions in Ontario